Kamakiriad is the second solo album by Steely Dan artist Donald Fagen, released in 1993. It was his first collaboration with Steely Dan partner Walter Becker since 1986, on Rosie Vela's album Zazu. Becker played guitar and bass and produced the album. The album is a futuristic, optimistic eight-song cycle about the journey of the narrator in his high-tech car, the Kamakiri (Japanese for praying mantis). It was nominated for a Grammy Award for Album of the Year 1994.

Music videos were produced for "Tomorrow's Girls" (starring Rick Moranis) and "Snowbound" (using stop motion animation).

Fagen and Becker embarked on their first tour as Steely Dan since 1974 to support the album.

Track listing
All songs written by Donald Fagen, except where noted.
"Trans-Island Skyway" – 6:30
"Countermoon" – 5:05
"Springtime" – 5:06
"Snowbound" (Walter Becker, Fagen) – 7:08
"Tomorrow's Girls" – 6:17
"Florida Room" (Fagen, Libby Titus) – 6:02
"On the Dunes" – 8:07
"Teahouse on the Tracks" – 6:09

Bonus tracks, from The Nightfly Trilogy MVI boxed set
"Big Noise, New York" – 5:21
"Confide in Me" – 4:15
"Blue Lou" – 7:01
"Shanghai Confidential" – 4:54

Personnel
Donald Fagen – keyboards, vocals
Walter Becker – bass, lead guitar
Randy Brecker – trumpet, flugelhorn
Cornelius Bumpus – tenor saxophone
Angela Clemmons-Patrick – background vocals
Leroy Clouden – percussion, drums
Ronnie Cuber – baritone saxophone
Illinois Elohainu – tenor saxophone (a fictive musician, actually Fagen himself plays a saxophone sample on the keyboard)
Lawrence Feldman – flute, tenor saxophone
Frank Floyd – background vocals
Diane Garisto – background vocals
Paul Griffin – Hammond organ
Amy Helm – background vocals
Bashiri Johnson – percussion
Birch Johnson – trombone
Mindy Jostyn – background vocals
Brenda King – background vocals
Curtis King – background vocals
Lou Marini – clarinet, flute, alto saxophone
Dennis McDermott – drums
Jenni Muldaur – background vocals
Christopher Parker – drums
Jim Pugh – trombone
Tim Ries – tenor saxophone
Roger Rosenberg – baritone saxophone
Alan Rubin – trumpet, flugelhorn
Catherine Russell – background vocals
Dian Sorel – background vocals
Fonzi Thornton – background vocals
David Tofani – flute, tenor saxophone
Georg Wadenius – guitar

Production
Producer: Walter Becker
Engineers: Phil Burnett, David Michael Dill, Tom Fritze, Andy Grassi, Troy Halderson, Bob Mitchel, John Neff, Roger Nichols, Dave Russell, Jay A. Ryan, Tony Volante, Wayne Yurgelun
Mastering: Scott Hull, Glenn Meadows
Sample editing: Craig Siegal
Digital technician: Phil Burnett
Digital delay: Craig Siegal
Horn arrangements: Donald Fagen
Rhythm arrangements: Donald Fagen
Design: Carol Bobolts
Photography: James Hamilton
Liner notes: Donald Fagen, Tim White

Charts

Weekly charts

Year-end charts

References

Donald Fagen albums
1993 albums
Concept albums
Reprise Records albums
Albums produced by Walter Becker